The 1996 Qatar Open, known as the 1995 Qatar Mobil Open for sponsorship reasons, was a tennis tournament played on outdoor hard courts at the Khalifa International Tennis Complex in Doha in Qatar and was part of the World Series of the 1996 ATP Tour. It was the fourth edition of the tournament and was held from 1 January through 7 January 1996. Unseeded Petr Korda won the singles title.

Finals

Singles

 Petr Korda defeated  Younes El Aynaoui 7–6(7–5), 2–6, 7–6(7–5)

Doubles

 Mark Knowles /  Daniel Nestor defeated  Jacco Eltingh /  Paul Haarhuis 7–6, 6–3
 It was Knowles' 1st title of the year and the 5th of his career. It was Nestor's 1st title of the year and the 3rd of his career.

References

External links
 Official website
 ATP tournament profile

 
Qatar Open
Qatar Open (tennis)
1996 in Qatari sport